Soup.io was an Austrian social networking and microblogging site.

History
Soup.io allowed the user to publish (editable in HTML) text, images, videos, links, quotes and reviews. It allowed users to share files (within the limit of 10 MB) and create events. Its interface professed to follow the Keep it Simple, Stupid principle (KISS). In March 2015, Soup.io had close to  million monthly users.

In January 2017, Soup.io suffered data loss, and had to be restored over several weeks from a 2015 backup.

On 10 July 2020, a shutdown warning was sent to all users with less than 10 days notice, citing "high costs and low revenue streams". The shutdown date was 20 July 2020.

Currently 
Currently, the soup.io domain is owned by Web Orange Limited. The organization is a registered company in Hong Kong and it serves as a blogging platform for technology, business, lifestyle, etc.

Awards
Soup.io received an investment during Seedcamp 2008, has been classified by the Guardian as one of the essential 100 websites of 2009, and was named "Innovative IT-Challenger" by APA – IT in September 2009.

References

External links

Microblogging software
Blog hosting services
Austrian social networking websites
Internet properties disestablished in 2020
Internet properties established in 2007